The following is a list of players, both past and current, who appeared at least in one game for the New Taipei CTBC DEA (2021–present) franchise.



Players

A

B

C

E

G

H

I

J

K

L

M

S

T

W

Z

References

T1 League all-time rosters